Boingo Alive is a double album by American new wave band Oingo Boingo, released in 1988. It was performed and recorded live in a rehearsal studio with no audience, with the band performing songs from previous albums and two previously unreleased songs to celebrate the 10th anniversary of the band's beginning.

Background
According to the Los Angeles Times, as well as the album's sleeve sticker and promotional material, Boingo Alive was recorded live on a soundstage over nine nights in July 1988. The sticker and ads also read, "Hear our greatest hits the way they were meant to be heard—live".

After Oingo Boingo migrated from A&M Records/I.R.S. Records to MCA Records in 1984, A&M had retained ownership of the band's previous recordings, but by 1988 the band became legally able to re-record their old material. Frontman Danny Elfman stated that Boingo Alive was a project the band had been planning for years, as they had been unhappy with the sound of their studio recordings, particularly with regards to the comparative lack of "energy". Elfman stated, "This is our 10th anniversary as a band and we wanted to present our songs in a way that our fans have grown accustomed to (when) seeing us."

On the choice to eschew an audience, Elfman said at the time, "I hate the poor fidelity and the crowd noise from live albums. It made more sense this way. It's just us playing in a big room with a mobile truck outside—minus the 10,000 screaming teenagers."

"Winning Side" peaked at No. 14 on the Billboard Modern Rock Tracks chart in November 1988.

Track listing

Disc 1

All tracks written and composed by Danny Elfman.

Tracks marked with an asterisk do not appear on the LP and cassette versions of the album.

Disc 2

All tracks written and composed by Danny Elfman, except "Violent Love", by Willie Dixon.

Personnel

Oingo Boingo
 John Avila – bass, vocals
 Steve Bartek – guitars
 Danny Elfman – vocals, rhythm guitar
 Carl Graves – keyboards, vocals
 Johnny "Vatos" Hernandez – drums, percussion
 Sam Phipps – tenor and soprano saxophones
 Leon Schneiderman – baritone saxophone
 Dale Turner – trumpet, trombone

Additional musician
 Bruce Fowler – trombone

Technical
 Danny Elfman – co-producer
 Steve Bartek – co-producer
 John Avila – co-producer
 Bill Jackson – engineer, mixing 
 Jim Scott – additional mixing, additional recording
 Laura Engel – live photos
 Le Mobile – audio recording
 Dean Burt – additional recording
 David Roberts – assistant engineer
 Greg Stevenson – monitors
 Charlie Brocco – assistant engineer (mixing)
 Robert Hart – assistant engineer (mixing)
 Jeff DeMorris – assistant engineer (mixing)
 Stephen Marcussen – mastering 
 Vartan – art direction
 DZN, The Design Group – design
 Georganne Deen – illustration
 John Scarpati – group photo
 Steve Jennings – live photos
 John Burlan – live photos
 Sean Riley – live photos

References

Oingo Boingo albums
Albums produced by Danny Elfman
Albums produced by Steve Bartek
1988 compilation albums
1988 albums
Albums with cover art by Gary Panter
MCA Records live albums